Shoah: Four Sisters is a 2017 French documentary film that premiered at the 2017 New York Film Festival and first aired on TV as a four-part series on January 23, 2018. It is both Claude Lanzmann’s final film and a continuation of Shoah and chronicles the lives of four women who escaped the concentration camps and tried to find a life after the Holocaust. Lanzman traveled around four Eastern European countries and interviewed and got accounts from four separate women. The four-and-a-half hour cut of the film (half of Shoah’s length) debuted in American theaters on November 14, 2018. It was on France’s shortlist to compete in the Best Documentary category.

Box office 
The movie opened Wednesday in New York City’s Quad Cinema with a total of $474. The next day the movie increased 6% to $515, for a two-day total of $919. The film continued to post steadily increases through the weekend ($550 on Friday, $897 on Saturday, and $1,393 on Sunday) for a three-day total of $2,840 and a five-day total of $3,829.

References

External links

2017 films
French documentary films
Films directed by Claude Lanzmann
2010s French films